The 2021–22 season is the 77th season in the existence of FK Jablonec and the club's 28th consecutive season in the top flight of Czech football. In addition to the domestic league, FK Jablonec are participating in this season's editions of the Czech Cup, the UEFA Europa League and the UEFA Europa Conference League.

Players

First-team squad
.

Out on loan

Transfers

Pre-season and friendlies

Competitions

Overall record

Czech First League

League table

Results summary

Results by round

Matches

Czech Cup

UEFA Europa League

Third qualifying round
The draw for the third qualifying round was held on 19 July 2021.

UEFA Europa Conference League

Play-off round
The draw for the play-off round was held on 2 August 2021.

Group stage

References

FK Jablonec seasons
Jablonec
Jablonec
Jablonec